Tympanocryptis condaminensis, the Condamine earless dragon, is a species of agama found in Australia.

References

condaminensis
Agamid lizards of Australia
Taxa named by Jane Melville
Reptiles described in 2014